Storfjorden or Storfjord is a  long fjord in the Sunnmøre region of Møre og Romsdal county, Norway. It stretches from the village of Hareid in the west to the villages of Tafjord and Geiranger in the east. The Storfjorden system branches off into several smaller fjords including the famous Geirangerfjord and Tafjorden. At the village of Stranda, the main fjord branches off into the Sunnylvsfjorden-Geirangerfjorden to the west and the Norddalsfjorden-Tafjorden to the east.

The name literally means the "big" or "great" fjord, indicating that this is a long fjord and it is, in fact, the main fjord in this region. The Storfjord is a dominant topographical feature in the Sunnmøre region as it cuts the region in two parts that are only connected by ferry. The deepest point in the fjord is  near the village of Dyrkorn in the municipality of Stordal.

The landscape around Storfjorden is typical for Western Norway. Further to the east there are higher mountains. Most of the Storfjorden has characteristically steep or very steep shores, interrupted by several gentle valleys stretching up to  into the hinterland. In this way, the Storfjorden system is, along with the Nordfjorden, Sognefjorden, and Hardangerfjorden fjord-systems, the major samples of the typical west coast fjords highly praised by visitors.

On the steep shores of the fjord, there are several historic mountain farms such as Ytste Skotet in Stordal and Me-Åkernes, Skageflå, and Knivsflå in Stranda.

Branches and sections
From the coast to the inland
Mouth (the fjord flows out into two other fjords)
Sulafjorden 
Vartdalsfjorden 
Outer Storfjorden (there are two major branches off the fjord in this area)
Hjørundfjorden (which branches into the Norangsfjorden and Storfjorden)
Sykkylvsfjorden
Inner Storfjorden (there are two major branches off the fjord in this area)
Norddalsfjorden, which flows into the Tafjorden
Sunnylvsfjorden, which flows into the Geirangerfjorden

Municipalities and villages

This is a list of settlements along the fjord
Sula
Leirvågen
Ålesund
Vegsundet, Emleim, Valle, Sjøholt
Sykkylven
Aure, Ikornnes
Stranda
Stranda, Liabygda, Geiranger, Hellesylt
Fjord
Stordal, Valldal/Sylte, Eidsdal, Norddal, Tafjord

Transportation
Several car ferries cross the fjord, but there are no bridges or tunnels. The proposed Storfjord Bridge may one day cross the fjord, but it is cost prohibitive at this time. Here is a list of the ferry crossings: 
Hareid-Sulesund from Hareidlandet in the municipality of Hareid to Sula island in Sula across the Sulafjorden
Leirvågen-Festøya-Hundeidvik (a 3-point ferry crossing) from Leirvågen on Sula island across the Storfjorden to Festøya in Ørsta then on to Hundeidvik across the Hjørundfjorden in Sykkylven
Leknes-Sæbø across the Hjørundfjorden
Ørsneset-Magerholm from Ørsneset in Sykkylven to Magerholm in Ålesund, part of Norwegian County Road 60
Stranda-Liabygda from the village of Stranda in the west to Liabygda in the east, Norwegian County Road 650
Eidsdal-Linge across the Norddalsfjorden, part of Norwegian County Road 63 
Geiranger-Hellesylt a tourist route along the Geirangerfjord, only operates in the summer

Due to the steep slopes along the shores, road construction is challenging and overland road transport is often limited to valleys. On the northern shore of the Storfjorden, there a continuous network of roads from Tafjord to the island of Sula using the roads 63, 650, E39, 656, 60 and 61. On the southern shore, there are only short sections of roads along the fjord itself.

During summer the Hurtigruten line visits the Storfjorden and Geirangerfjorden regularly.

Landslide and megatsunami

Damaging waves struck as far as way as Ørskog. The waves killed 17 people. It was the first natural disaster in Norway to be reported and documented in historic time.

Gallery

References

External links
Storfjordnytt - local newspaper for Storfjord area 
StorfjordNett
Storfjordens venner - society for the preservation of abandoned farms at Storfjord

Fjords of Møre og Romsdal
Fjord (municipality)
Ørsta
Stranda